Chryseobacterium xixisoli  is a Gram-negative, rod-shaped and  non-motile bacteria from the genus of Chryseobacterium which has been isolated from soil from the Xixi wetland in China.

References 

xixisoli
Bacteria described in 2014